Garrowby is a hamlet in the East Riding of Yorkshire, England.
It lies to the north of the A166 road
and forms part of the civil parish of Kirby Underdale.

Garrowby Hill is the summit of Bishop Wilton Wold which is the highest point of the Yorkshire Wolds. It is the subject of a 1998 painting by David Hockney.

Garrowby Hall is a country house which stands in a 13,500 acre estate and is home to the Earl and Countess of Halifax. The Wood family (the Earls of Halifax) have lived there for some 200 years. It was remodelled in 1980 by Francis Johnson.

References

External links

Hamlets in the East Riding of Yorkshire